Science Fiction and Fantasy Writers of Japan, or SFWJ (Japanese official name: , Nihon SF Sakka Club) is an organization of SF-related people, professional or semi-professional. It was formerly a friendship organization, but it is a general incorporated association since August 24, 2017.

Mission 
There are three missions in SFWJ.
 SFWJ promotes mutual friendship of members.
 SFWJ establishes and operates award(s) such as Nihon SF Taisho Award.
 SFWJ manages various activities in relation with the above award(s).

Membership 
Though the official English name of the organization is "Science Fiction and Fantasy Writers of Japan", members are not limited to writer. Translator, editor, artist, creator, or promoter/ contributor in various genres in relation with SF and/or fantasy, professional or semi-professional, is granted to be a member, if a candidate is acknowledged by the organization.

History 
SFWJ was founded on 3 March 1963 at Shinjuku, Tokyo, Japan. The founder members are 11 persons who are Takashi Ishikawa, Sakyo Komatsu, Tetsurō Kawamura, Morihiro Saitō (JA), Hakukō Saitō, Ryo Hanmura, Masami Fukushima, Shinichi Hoshi, Ryu Mitsuse, Yū Mori (Hiroshi Minamiyama JA) and Tetsu Yano. They were SF-related writers, translators, and editors.

The club was friendship group and the secretariat was located at Hayakawa Publishing, Tokyo at first. There was no president, but Masami Fukushima who was editor in chief of S-F Magazine was substantial president. Head of the club was a chief of secretariat.

After the death of Fukushima in 1976, Shin'ichi Hoshi took office as president of the club.

Taiyo Fujii is a president of the organization as of March, 2018.

List of presidents and chiefs of secretariat

Member list 

Member list of the SFWJ as of February 5, 2018:

Honorary members 
 Tōru Arimura (JA, 1945 - ) writer 
 Kenji Iguchi (JA, 1949 - ) SF researcher 
 Takashi Ishikawa (JA, September 17, 1930 - )  critic, writer 
 Akira Kagami (JA, January 2, 1948 - ) translator, writer 
 Shinji Kajio (JA, December 24, 1947 - ) writer 
 Naoyuki Katō (JA, 1952 - ) illustrator 
 Musashi Kanbe (JA, January 16, 1948 - ) writer 
 Tadashi Kōsai (JA, December 21, 1938 - ) automobile critic, writer 
 Masaki Tsuji (JA, March 23, 1932 - ) anime scenario writer, comic author 
 Jinsei Chō (JA, 1952 - ) illustrator /uncertain/ 
 Yasutaka Tsutsui (JA, September 24, 1934 - ) writer, dramatist 
 Aritsune Toyota (JA, May 25, 1938 - ) writer, critic, essayist 
 Taku Mayumura (JA, October 20, 1934 - ) writer 
 Hiroshi Minamiyama (JA, July 29, 1937 - ) editor, translator, occult researcher, (alias: Yū Mori) 
 Baku Yumemakura (JA, January 1, 1951 - ) writer, essayist

Current members

Surname - A, I, U, E, O 
 Kazu Aoki (JA, December 27, 1961 - ) writer 
 Hideko Akao (JA) translator 
 Kan Akiyama (JA, December 22, 1960s - ) writer /uncertain/  
 Norihiko Asao (/uncertain/) media writer 
 Taku Ashibe (JA, May 21, 1958 - ) mystery writer 
 Tsuyoshi Abe (/uncertain/) 
 Hiroyasu Amase (JA, November, 1931 - ) writer, SF fan, (alias: Susumu Watanabe)
 Godō Amano? (/uncertain/) 
 Hotori Amano (/uncertain/) writer 
 Motoko Arai (JA, August 8, 1960 - ) writer 
 Yoshio Aramaki (JA, April 12, 1933 - ) writer, critic 
 Fumihiko Iino (JA, June 16, 1961 - ) writer 
 Haruna Ikezawa (JA, December 15, 1975 - ) voice actress, essayist 
 Noriaki Ikeda (JA, January 14, 1955 - ) free writer, anime author 
 Muneo Ishikawa (/uncertain/) writer 
 Yoshiyuki Ishiwa (1962 - ) critic 
 Tsuyoki Isobe (/uncertain/) critic 
 Ban Ippongi (JA, January 4, 1965 - ) manga artist, cosplayer 
 Tsuyoshi Inoue (JA, 1964 - ) writer 
 Masahiko Inoue (JA, January 13, 1960 - ) writer 
 Takayuki Ino (JA, 1961 - ) writer 
 Keiichirō Urahama (JA, April 23, 1963 - ) writer 
 Yū Esaka (JA, September 20, 1953 - ) vs story  writer 
 Yōko Enoki (JA, October 3, ? - ) writer 
 Tadashi Ōta (JA, February 24, 1959 - ) mystery writer 
 HIroyuki Ōhashi (JA, 1959 - ) free writer, editor 
 Mariko Ōhara (JA, March 20, 1959 - ) writer 
 Hajime Ōwada (1949 - ) SF researcher, writer 
 Akira Okawada (JA, 1981 - ) critic, translator 
 Satoshi Ogawa (JA, December 25, 1986 - ) writer 
 Yūki Oginome (JA, February 2, 1965 - ) writer 
 Tsutomu Oshizawa (1956 - ) critic, writer

Surname - K 
 Makio Kaji (/uncertain/) editor 
 Chise Kasuya (JA, 1961 - ) writer 
 Junichi Kadokura (/uncertain/) music critic? 
 Motoyuki Kanae (/uncertain/) critic 
 Azami Kanō (/uncertain/) writer 
 Chiaki Kawamata (JA, December 4, 1948 - ) writer, critic 
 Kiyomi Kishima (1971 - ) /uncertain/ 
 Shinji Kimoto (JA, 1956 - ) writer, movie director, /uncertain/
 Sanzō Kusaka (JA, February 21, 1968 - ) SF, mystery researcher 
 Jin Kusakami (JA, December 20, 1959 - ) writer 
 Gengen Kusano (JA, April 16, 1990 - ) writer 
 Saori Kumi (JA, April 30, 1959 - ) writer, essayist 
 Ryō Kodachi (/uncertain/) writer 
 Mari Kotani (JA, July 11, 1958 - ) critic 
 Bin Konno (JA, September 27, 1955 - ) writer, manga author

Surname - S 
 Eiichirō Saitō (JA, July 16, 1952 - ) writer
 Yoshihiro Shiozawa (JA, 1968 - ) editor 
 Sami Shinosaki (JA, July 22, 1960 - ) writer
 Katsuie Shibata (JA, October 3, 1987 - ) writer
 Yōichi Shimada (JA, 1956 - ) translator
 Riri Shimada (May 25, ? - ) writer 
 Kei Shimojima (JA, April 18, 1963 - ) writer
 Yumiko Shirai (JA, March 15, 1967 - ) manga artist
 Kazuma Shinjō (JA) writer
 Masaaki Shindo (JA, September 18, 1948 - ) critic, writer, translator
 Shinobu Suga (JA, November 7, 1972 - ) writer
 Satoru Seki (JA, March 26, 1957 - ) editor, game producer
 Ryūji Seki (JA, /uncertain/) critic

(Continued)

Deceased members

Notes and references

External links 
  

Science fiction organizations
1963 establishments in Japan
Japanese science fiction